The Campeonato Brasileiro Série C 1988, known as the Divisão de Acesso, was a football series played from 22 October to 18 December 1988. It was the third level of the Brazilian National League. The competition had 43 clubs, and two of them were originally promoted to Série B.

In 1989, the Brazilian Football Confederation declared that the 1988 Série C was a deficitary tournament, deciding to extinguish it and allowing 96 teams in the 1989 Campeonato Brasileiro Série B.

First phase

Group 1

Group 2

Group 3

Comercial withdrew from the tournament.

Group 4

Serrano withdrew from the tournament.

Group 5

Group 6

América withdrew from the tournament.

Group 7

Group 8

Group 9

Group 10

Group 11

Group 12

Second phase

Group 13

Group 14

Group 15

Group 16

Group 17

Group 18

Third phase

Group 19

Group 20

Final

União São João declared as the Campeonato Brasileiro Série C champions after having a better record (bigger number of wins) during the tournament.

References

Campeonato Brasileiro Série C seasons
1988 in Brazilian football leagues